Tavener is a surname and may be:

 Colin Tavener, English professional footballer
 Jackie Tavener (1897–1969), American professional baseball player
 John Tavener, various people
 Mark Tavener (1954–2007), English writer, humorist, and dramatist
 Robert Tavener (1920–2004), English printmaker, illustrator, and teacher